Hasty may refer to:
 Hasty, Arkansas, United States
 Hasty, Colorado, United States
 HMS Hasty (1894), a Charger class destroyer
 HMS Hasty (H24), an H-class destroyer
 Hasty (racehorse), an unconsidered competitor who finished fifth in the 1840 Grand National

People with the surname
 James Hasty (born 1965), American football cornerback
 JaMycal Hasty (born 1996), American football player
 Stanley Hasty (born 1920), American clarinetist

See also
 Haste (disambiguation)
 Hastie
 Hasty attack
 Hasty pudding